General McKee may refer to:

George H. McKee (1923–2015), U.S. Air Force lieutenant general
Seth J. McKee (1916–2016), U.S. Air Force four-star general
William J. McKee (soldier) (1853–1925), U.S. Army brigadier general
William F. McKee (1906–1987), U.S. Air Force four-star general